James Frederick Schön (1802, in Ober Weiler – 30 March 1889, in Chatham) was a German missionary and linguist who was active in Sierra Leone. He also participated in the Niger expedition of 1841.

After attending the Basel Seminary, Schön attended the Church Missionary Society College in London. He qualified as a priest in 1832 and immediately went to Sierra Leone. He remained active with the Church Missionary Society until 1853.

He became an expert on the Hausa language and was awarded an honorary doctorate from Oxford University in 1884.

Works
 Translations of seven Parables and Discources of our Lord Jesus Christ into the Sherbro Language of West Africa (1839)
 Journal of the Niger Expedition (1842)
 Vocabulary and Elements of Grammar of the Haussa Language (1843)
 Translations of Genesis, Exodus, the Gospels, and the Acts of the Apostles into the Hausa Language (1857-1861)
 Grammar of the Haussa Language (1862)
 Dictionary of the Hausa Language (1876).

His papers are archived at the University of Birmingham.

References

1802 births
Missionary linguists
1883 deaths
German Anglican missionaries
Linguists
Anglican missionaries in Sierra Leone
Anglican missionaries in Nigeria